Toklu can refer to:

 Toklu, Besni
 Toklu, Oltu
 Toklu Dede Mosque